Miomancalla is an extinct genus of prehistoric flightless alcids that lived on the Pacific coast of today's California in the Miocene epoch. It contained two species, M. howardi and M. wetmorei.

References 

Auks
Extinct flightless birds
Neogene birds
Prehistoric bird genera